Simon Hellholm (born 24 February 1997) is a Swedish ice hockey player. He is currently playing with Nybro Vikings IF.

Career
Born in Linköping, Sweden, Hellholm played junior hockey, with local team Linköpings HC. In 2011–12, he debuted at the under-16 level as a 15-year-old, playing fifteenth games in the J16 Elit. The following season he dressed for fourteen U-18 games, recording four goals and three assists. He also competed with a regional all-star team from Östergötland in the annual TV-pucken, an under-15 national tournament, and notched seven goals and four assists over eight games. In 2013–14, Hellholm played eight games with Linköpings HC's J20 SuperElit team. After two impressive seasons in the J20 SuperElit; appearing in 87 regular season games, and recording 48 points. Hellholm logged his first minutes in Sweden's top-flight SHL.

Career statistics

Regular season and playoffs

References

External links

1997 births
Living people
Swedish ice hockey forwards
Sportspeople from Linköping
Linköping HC players